YP-251 was a converted fishing vessel which served in the U.S. Navy during World War II from 1941 to 1945. She operated in the waters of the Territory of Alaska during the war. Before the war, she operated as the commercial fishing vessel MV Foremost from 1924 to 1941. After the war, she again operated as the commercial vessel MV Foremost from 1946 to 1954, then was renamed MV LeRoy.

Pre-World War II commercial service

MV Foremost was constructed in 1924 by Marine Ways at Seattle, Washington, for Andrew Peterson for use as halibut-fishing vessel. and was assigned the official number 223964. Sometime around 1939, she was registered to Marcus Ness of Ketchikan, Territory of Alaska.

U.S. Navy service

On 11 December 1941, the United States Navy acquired Foremost for World War II service as a yard patrol boat. After her conversion into a patrol vessel, she was placed in service on 31 December 1941 as YP-251. Assigned to the 17th Naval District, Northwestern Sea Frontier, and Alaskan Sea Frontier, she carried out patrol duties in Alaskan waters for the remainder of World War II, based at Ketchikan. She was crewed by United States Coast Guard personnel throughout her naval service.

The U.S. Coast Guard cutter  and the Royal Canadian Navy minesweeper  joined YP-251 on 9 July 1942, and the three ships began a search for the submarine in Dixon Entrance southeast of Annette Island in Southeast Alaska. McLane reported that she gained sound contact on a submarine at 0800, but then lost it, and a depth charge she dropped set to explode at a depth of  failed to detonate. McLane regained sound contact at 0905 and chased the submarine for an hour, reporting that the submarine zigzagged and ran at short intervals to try to evade her, and after an hour she again lost contact. McLane and YP-251 reported that bubbles rose to the surface. The vessels reported that a torpedo passed ahead of McLane and only  astern of YP-251 at 1735, leaving a  feather that indicated the submarine's firing position, which McLane turned toward. YP-251 reported that she sighted a periscope and dropped a depth charge over the spot where the periscope submerged, and McLane followed up that attack with two depth charges of her own. McLane then attempted to regain sonar contact on the submarine. The vessels reported that an oil slick rose to the surface, and at 1935 YP-251 reported sighting a periscope, dropped a depth charge, and struck a submerged object, which she rode over. McLane then dropped two depth charges, after which the vessels reported that oil, bubbles, and what appeared to be rock wool (used to deaden sounds in submarines) rose to the surface. McLane continued to search the area for any sign of the submarine until early on the morning of 10 July 1942, but found none. The commanding officers of the two vessels — Lieutenant Neils P. Thomsen, USCG, of YP-251 and Lieutenant Ralph Burns, USCG, of McLane — received the Legion of Merit for the action, and in 1947 the Joint Army-Navy Assessment Committee identified the sunken submarine as the Japanese submarine . In 1967, however, the U.S. Navy retracted that assessment after determining that Ro-32 had been inactive in Japan at the time of the sinking and had remained afloat through the end of World War II, and the identity of the submarine reportedly sunk on 9 July 1942 remains undetermined.

After the conclusion of World War II in August 1945, YP-251 was stricken from the Naval Vessel Register on 24 October 1945. The U.S. Navy transferred her to the War Shipping Administration on 18 March 1946 for disposal.

Post-World War II commercial service

In 1946, Robert Prothero registered the vessel at Seattle under her former name, MV Foremost. She was registered to Manson F. Backus, executor of estate of LeRoy M. Backus, at Seattle in 1950. Renamed MV Le Roy in 1954, she was sold to Alvin Osterback of Sand Point, Alaska, in 1957.

Awards
SOURCES 
 American Campaign Medal
 World War II Victory Medal

Notes

References

Footnotes

Bibliography 

Bruhn, David D. Battle Stars for the "Cactus Navy": America's Fishing Vessels and Yachts in World War II. Berwyn Heights, Maryland: Heritage Books 2014. 

1924 ships
Fishing ships of the United States
Ships built in Seattle
World War II patrol vessels of the United States
Yard patrol boats of the United States Navy